Alhar railway station is located in Alhar village, Sialkot district of Punjab province, Pakistan.

See also
 List of railway stations in Pakistan
 Pakistan Railways

References

{{|الہڑ  
   ریلوے اسٹیشن}}
Railway stations in Sialkot District
Railway stations on Wazirabad–Narowal Branch Line